Vietnam is located on the eastern margin of the Indochinese peninsula and occupies about 331,211.6 square kilometers, of which about 25% was under cultivation in 1987. It borders the Gulf of Tonkin, Gulf of Thailand, and Pacific Ocean, along with China, Laos, and Cambodia.

The boundary with Laos was settled on both an ethnic and geographical basis between the rulers of Vietnam and Laos in the mid-seventeenth century. The Annamite Range as a reference, was formally defined by a delimitation treaty signed in 1977 and ratified in 1986. The frontier with Cambodia, defined at the time of French annexation of the western part of the Mekong Delta in 1867, remained essentially unchanged, according to Hanoi, until some unresolved border issues were finally settled in the 1982–85 period. The land and sea boundary with China, delineated under the France-China treaties of 1887 and 1895, is "the frontier line" accepted by Hanoi. China agreed in 1957–58 to respect that border line. However, in February 1979, following the Sino-Vietnamese War, Hanoi complained that from 1957 onward China had provoked numerous border incidents as part of its anti-Vietnam policy and expansionist designs in Southeast Asia. Among the territorial infringements cited was the Chinese occupation in January 1974 of the Paracel Islands, claimed by both countries in a dispute left unresolved in the 1980s.

Physiography
The country is divided into the highlands and the Hong River Delta in the north, the Annamite Range along with the coastal lowlands in the centre, and the Mekong Delta in the south.

Terrain
Vietnam is a country of tropical lowlands, hills, and densely forested highlands, with level land covering less than 20% of the area.

The spectacular Bản Giốc Waterfall is 272 km north of Hanoi and few tourists are seen there.

Red River Delta

The joined Delta of Hong River (Red River) and Thái Bình River is a flat, triangular region of 15,000 square kilometers. The Hong River Delta is smaller but more intensely developed and more densely populated than the Mekong Delta. Once an inlet of the Gulf of Tonkin, it has been filled in by the enormous alluvial deposits of the rivers over a period of millennia, and it advances one hundred meters into the Gulf annually. The ancestral home of the ethnic Vietnamese, the delta accounted for almost 70% of the agriculture and 80% of the industry of North Vietnam before 1975.

The Red River, rising in China's Yunnan Province, is about 1,200 kilometers long. Its two main tributaries, the Sông Lô (also called the Lo River, the Riviere Claire, or the Clear River) and the Sông Đà (also called the Black River or Riviere Noire), contribute to its high water volume, which averages 4,300 cubic meters per second.

The entire delta region, backed by the steep rises of the forested highlands, is no more than three meters above sea level, and much of it is one meter or less. The area is subject to frequent flooding; at some places the high-water mark of floods is fourteen meters above the surrounding countryside. For centuries flood control has been an integral part of the delta's culture and economy. An extensive system of dikes and canals has been built to contain the Red River and to irrigate the rich rice-growing delta. Modeled on that of China's, this ancient system has sustained a highly concentrated population and has made double-cropping wet-rice cultivation possible throughout about half the region.

Mountainous

The mountain plateaus in the north and northwest are inhabited mainly by tribal minority groups. The Dãy Trường Sơn (Annamite Range) originates in the Tibetan  and Yunnan regions of southwest China and forms Vietnam's border with Laos. It terminates in the Mekong River Delta north of Hồ Chí Minh City (formerly Saigon).

These central mountains, which have several high plateaus, are irregular in elevation and form. The northern section is narrow and very rugged; the country's highest peak, Fan Si Pan, rises to 3,142 meters in the extreme northwest. The southern portion has numerous spurs that divide the narrow coastal strip into a series of compartments. For centuries these topographical features not only rendered north–south communication difficult but also formed an effective natural barrier for the containment of the people living in the Mekong basin.

Central Highlands
Within the southern portion of Vietnam is a plateau known as the Central Highlands (Tây Nguyên), approximately 51,800 square kilometers of rugged mountain peaks, extensive forests, and rich soil. Comprising five relatively flat plateaus of basalt soil spread over the provinces of Đắk Lắk (or "Dac Lac"), Gia Lai, and Kon Tum, the highlands account for 16% of the country's arable land and 22% of its total forested land. Before 1975, North Vietnam had maintained that the Central Highlands and the Day Truong Son were strategic areas of paramount importance, essential to the domination not only of South Vietnam but also of the southern part of Indochina. Since 1975, the highlands have provided an area in which to relocate people from the densely populated lowlands.

Coastal lowlands
The narrow, flat coastal lowlands extend from south of the Red River Delta to the Mekong River basin. On the landward side, the Dãy Trường Sơn rises precipitously above the coast, its spurs jutting into the sea at several places. Generally the coastal strip is fertile and rice is cultivated intensively.

A recent global remote sensing analysis suggested that there were 3,069km² of tidal flats in Vietnam, making it the 10th ranking country in terms of how much tidal flat occurs there.

Mekong River Delta

The Mekong Delta, covering about 40,000 square kilometers, is a low-level plain not more than three meters above sea level at any point and criss-crossed by a maze of canals and rivers. So much sediment is carried by the Mekong's various branches and tributaries that the delta advances sixty to eighty meters into the sea every year. An official Vietnamese source estimates the amount of sediment deposited annually to be about 1 billion cubic meters, or nearly thirteen times the amount deposited by the Red River. About 10,000 square kilometers of the delta are under rice cultivation, making the area one of the major rice-growing regions of the world. The southern tip, known as the Cà Mau Peninsula is covered by dense jungle and mangrove swamps.

The Mekong, which is 4,220 kilometers long, is one of the 12 great rivers of the world. From its source in the Tibetan Plateau, it flows through the Tibetan and Yunnan regions of China, forms the boundary between Laos and Myanmar as well as between Laos and Thailand.  At Phnom Penh it merges with the Tonlé Sap and divides into two branches – the Sông Hậu Giang (Hậu Giang river) (known as the Bassac River on the Cambodian side) and the Sông Tiền Giang (Tiền Giang river) – and continues through Cambodia and the Mekong basin before draining into the South China Sea through nine mouths known as the Cửu Long (nine dragons). The river is heavily silted and is navigable by seagoing craft of shallow draft as far as Kompong Cham in Cambodia. A tributary entering the river at Phnom Penh drains the Tonlé Sap, a shallow freshwater lake that acts as a natural reservoir to stabilize the flow of water through the lower Mekong. When the river is in flood stage, its silted delta outlets are unable to carry off the high volume of water. Floodwaters back up into the Tonlé Sap, causing the lake to inundate as much as 10,000 square kilometers. As the flood subsides, the flow of water reverses and proceeds from the lake to the sea. The effect is to reduce significantly the danger of devastating floods in the Mekong delta, where the river floods the surrounding fields each year to a level of one to two meters.

Climate

Vietnam's climate, being located in the tropics and strongly influenced by the South China Sea has a monsoon-influenced tropical climate typical of that of mainland Southeast Asia. In the north, the climate is monsoonal with four distinct seasons (Spring, Summer, Autumn, and Winter) while in the south (areas south of the Hải Vân Pass), the climate is tropical monsoon with two seasons (rainy and dry). In addition, temperate climate exists in mountainous areas, which are found in Sa Pa and Da Lat, while a more continental climate exists in Lai Châu Province and Sơn La Province. The diverse topography, wide range of latitudes (Vietnam spans over 15° of latitude), and influences from the South China Sea lead to climatic conditions varying significantly between regions.

Based on geographic and climatic conditions, there are seven different climatic regions in Vietnam: Northwest, Northeast, North Delta (Red River Delta), North Central (North Central Coast), South Central (South Central Coast), Central Highlands, and the South. The South is subdivided into the Southeast for the southeastern provinces and the Mekong Delta for the southwestern provinces. Generally, these seven different climatic regions are grouped into two main types: The North (includes Northwest, Northeast, North Delta (Red River Delta), North Central (North Central Coast)) which includes all areas north of the Hải Vân Pass and the South (South Central Coast, Central Highlands and the extreme south) which includes all areas south of the Hải Vân Pass. These climatic regions are based on time of rainy season and other climatic elements such as insolation, sunshine, temperature, precipitation, and humidity.

During winter, polar air originating from the Siberian High penetrate deeply into the low latitudes, facilitated by the eastern Tibetan Plateau that funnels the air southwards in a northeast direction (the cool air is a wind coming from the northeast). Many cold fronts can penetrate into Vietnam during winter of which there are three to four occurrences every month in northern Vietnam. Cold weather, occasionally extreme cold can persist for a long time, being characterized by a long stretch of cloudless or partly cloudy days in the first half of winter or a long stretch of cloudy and drizzly conditions in the latter half of winter. Cold weather occurs more frequently in the north than in the south due to cold fronts penetrate the north more frequently.

In summer, the general wind pattern are southwesterly winds in the southern parts of Vietnam and southeasterly winds in northern Vietnam. The predominantly air blocks in Vietnam are the equatorial and tropical blocks that originate from high pressure systems in the Southern Hemisphere, and a maritime tropical block originating from the subtropical high pressure system in the Pacific Ocean (Pacific subtropical high pressure). In addition, during summer, Vietnam is influenced by tropical air from the Bay of Bengal which occurs when a continental low pressure originating from South Asia (South Asian continental low) moves eastwards towards Vietnam, covering almost all of Vietnam and southern China; this causes hot, dry weather in the North Central Coast as westerly winds descend and warm adiabatically on the eastern slopes of the Annamite Range (Truong Son Range). On average, eleven storms and tropical low pressures develop in the South China sea during summer of which half are tropical cyclones that originate from the western Pacific. These storms and cyclones then move westwards towards Vietnam. On average, Vietnam is affected by six to eight typhoons or tropical cyclones per year.

Spring and Fall are transitional seasons. The atmospheric circulation in these seasons represent a transition between winter–summer and summer–winter respectively.

At the highest altitudes in the Hoang Lien Son range, mean annual temperatures is only . The lowest mean annual temperatures are found in the mountainous areas where the altitude is higher and in northern areas due to their higher latitudes. Many mountainous areas in the north have experienced subzero conditions. In contrast, temperatures in the Spratly Islands never falls below . Because Vietnam is strongly influenced by the monsoon, the mean temperatures in Vietnam are lower than other countries located at the same latitude in Asia. The highest temperatures normally occurs in March–May in the south and May–July in the north. Temperatures in summer are relatively equal among the northern and southern parts of the country with differences being mostly due to altitude (the decrease in temperature is predominantly due to altitude).

The majority of rainfall occurs during the rainy season, which is responsible for 80%–90% of the annual precipitation. Generally, northern parts of the country receive more rainfall than southern parts of the country. Drizzle is a weather phenomenon that is characteristic of the weather in winter in the north and north central coast. Depending on the region, the onset of the rainy season (defined as when the monthly average precipitation exceeds ) differs.

Area and boundaries
Area:
Total: 
Land: 
Water: 

Area – comparative:
Slightly larger than the state of New Mexico in the United States.
Somewhat less than half as big as New South Wales, Australia.
About 1⅓ times the United Kingdom's size.

Land Boundaries:
Total: 
Border countries: Cambodia , China , Laos 

Coastline:  (excludes islands)

Maritime Claims:
Contiguous zone: 
Continental shelf:  or to the edge of the continental margin
Exclusive economic zone: , 
Territorial sea: 

Elevation extremes:
Lowest point: South China Sea 0 m
Highest point: Fansipan 

Rivers:
Longest river: Đồng Nai river (longest inland river) 

Lakes:
Biggest lake: Ba Bể Lake

Resources and land use
Natural resources: phosphates, coal, manganese, rare earth elements, bauxite, offshore oil and gas deposits, timber, hydropower

Land use:
Arable land: 19.64%
Permanent crops: 11.18%
Other: 69.18% (2011)

Irrigated land: 45,850 km2 (2005)

Total renewable water resources: 864.1 km3 (2011)

Freshwater withdrawal (domestic/industrial/agricultural):
total: 82.03 km3/yr (1%/4%/95%)
per capita: 965 m3/yr (2005)

Environmental concerns

Natural hazards: occasional typhoons (May to January) with extensive flooding, especially in the Mekong Delta.

Environment – current issues:
Logging and slash-and-burn agricultural practices contribute to deforestation and soil degradation; water pollution and overfishing threaten marine life populations; groundwater contamination limits potable water supply; growing urbanization and human migration are rapidly degrading environment in Hanoi and Hồ Chí Minh City

Environment – international agreements:
party to: Biodiversity, Climate Change, Climate Change-Kyoto Protocol, Desertification, Endangered Species, Environmental Modification, Hazardous Wastes, Law of the Sea, Ozone Layer Protection, Ship Pollution (MARPOL 73/78), Wetlands

Climate change

See also

Exclusive economic zone of Vietnam
List of endangered species in Vietnam
Zomia (geography)
History of Vietnam

References

Sources